The Supertaça de Portugal de Futsal Feminino is a futsal cup in Portugal, played by the winner of Portuguese Women's Futsal Championship and the winner of Portuguese Women's Futsal Cup.

It was created in 2014 and is organized by the Portuguese Football Federation. The current holders are Benfica, who have won a record 6 trophies.

Supertaça de Portugal finals

Performance by club

External links
Official website
Magiadofutsal

Futsal
Futsal competitions in Portugal
Recurring sporting events established in 2014
2014 establishments in Portugal
Women's football competitions in Portugal